Polyteles is a South American genus of broad-nosed weevils in the subfamily Entiminae, tribe Entimini. There are seven described species distributed in Argentina, Bolivia, Brazil, Ecuador, Paraguay, Peru, and Uruguay.

A key to identify the genus among the Entimini was published by Vanin and Gaiger in 2005.

Species 

Polyteles has four species, all of which are listed below:

 Polyteles atrox (Germar, 1824: 438): Brazil.

 Polyteles decussatus Pascoe, 1870: 441: Peru.
 Polyteles guerini Fåhraeus, 1840: 743: Argentina, Bolivia, Brazil, Paraguay, Uruguay.
 Polyteles inka (Heller, 1932: 2): Ecuador, Peru.
 Polyteles setosus Kirsch, 1874: 393: Peru
 Polyteles stevenii (Schönherr, 1826: 82): Argentina, Bolivia, Brazil, Paraguay.
 Polyteles uniformis (Heller, 1932: 2): Bolivia.

References 

Insects of South America
Entiminae
Insects described in 1829
Taxa named by Ernst Friedrich Germar